Esplanade – Theatres on the Bay (also known as the Esplanade Theatres (Malay: Teater di Persisiran) or simply The Esplanade) is a statutory board under the Ministry of Culture, Community and Youth (MCCY) and a performing arts centre located in the Downtown Core of Singapore near the mouth of the Singapore River. Named after the nearby Esplanade Park, it consists of a concert hall which seats about 1,600 and a theatre with a capacity of about 2,000 for the performing arts.

History
In 1989, the Advisory Council on Culture and the Arts, chaired by Deputy Prime Minister Ong Teng Cheong, produced a report assessing the status of arts in Singapore. The report would form the blueprint for cultural policy in Singapore, and led to the establishment of the National Arts Council and National Heritage Board.  The report noted a lack of suitable performance arts venues; for example, Victoria Theatre was deemed only suitable for small to medium-sized performances, while Victoria Concert Hall was similarly lacking in its seating capacity and stage size. It recommended that a new performing arts centre be built, and in 1992 the Singapore Arts Centre (now known as "Esplanade Co Ltd") was established to build the Esplanade. The name for the centre was revealed in 1994. It was named after Esplanade due to its significant presence in the Esplanade Park.

Planning began in 1992, headed by the Singapore Arts Centre Co. It was developed at the cost of about SGD 600 million. Construction officially started on 11 August 1996, with a groundbreaking ceremony officiated by then Deputy Prime Minister Dr. Tony Tan.  The Esplanade occupies the site of the former "Satay Club", a popular food haunt for Singaporeans which had been discontinued prior to the Esplanade's construction. The "Satay Club" had been relocated next to Sembawang Shopping Centre before moving over to the Gardens by the Bay since 2012, before closing down.

Completed in February 2001, the centre was officially opened on 12 October 2002, by the then President of Singapore S. R. Nathan.

On 5 July 2005, the opening ceremony of the 117th IOC Session was staged in the Esplanade, featuring a 30-minute-long performance aimed at showcasing Singapore's multi-cultural heritage to her international audience.

Since 17 April 2010, Esplanade MRT station was opened, which provides a connection to the island's train system and the station was named after the theatre.

For its last financial year ending March 2014, the Esplanade incurred a loss of S$2.3 million, the first operating deficit since its opening. This loss was despite the Esplanade racking up relatively similar numbers in terms of audience attendance and activities from the previous year and was attributed primarily to the drop in sponsorship and donations.

Exercise Heartbeat 2016, simulating the Nice terrorist attacks, was held at this building on 2 September 2016.

Design

The building was designed by two architectural firms working in conjunction: by DP Architects (DPA) of Singapore and the London-based Michael Wilford & Partners (MWP), although the latter left the project in May 1995. The design consists of two rounded space frames fitted with triangulated glass elements and sunshades, which balance outward views with solar shading.

The original design, presented to the public in 1994, consisted of unadorned glass cases over the theatres, and initially elicited criticisms from the public, including calling it "two copulating aardvarks". Critics also accused that the design is insensitive to Singapore's location and climate as it would have created a greenhouse in the tropical climate of Singapore, but according to DPA director Vikas Gore some form of shading was always intended, and a cladding of aluminium sunshades was added to the final design.  The unique architectural design has been said to have an appearance similar to either a durian (a tropical fruit) or the eyes of a fly. Hence, the building is colloquially known to locals as "the big durians". More than 7,000 triangular aluminium sunshades that cover its two circular glass shell structures looked somewhat like spikes on two halves of the fruit. The structure was not intended to be a durian; it ended up being like that because it seemed to the architects the most interesting way of doing sunshades. They wanted to use glass because the views from Esplanade are beautiful in all directions, but since Singapore is so close to the equator, the structure also had to be protected from the sunshine and heat radiation.

Facilities

Performance venues
Other than performing venues, the Esplanade also contains meeting venues, as well as other lifestyle and arts related services. The concert hall and theatre are connected to the main concourse via a foyer, while the Esplanade Mall is accessible through an entry point located between these 2 halls.

Concert hall

The concert hall serves as a venue for concerts, recitals, and other performances. There are only five other halls in the world with such state-of-the-art acoustics.

The orchestral platform is able to hold up to 120 musicians.

The concert hall's pipe organ comprises 4740 pipes and 61 stops. It was designed and built by Johannes Klais Orgelbau.

The Concert Hall is able to seat about 1,600 people over four levels. Types of seats include Stalls, Foyer stalls, and Circles 1, 2, and 3. There are another 200 seats in the choir stalls behind the concert hall stage, which may be converted into Gallery seats for an additional 200 people.

Theatre
The Lyric Theatre which has a capacity of about 2,000 seats is a type of an adaptation of the horseshoe form of a traditional European opera house.

Recital Studio
The fan-shaped Recital Studio is able to contain 245 people and is a venue for small scale chamber musical performances, as well as presentations and meetings.

Theatre Studio
The Theatre Studio, with a capacity of up to 220, is a small setting for experimental theatre and dance presentations.

Other facilities

The library@esplanade, located on the third floor, is Singapore's first public library devoted to the performing arts. There are also outdoor performing centres, and retail and food space at the Esplanade Mall. There is an outdoor open space on the fourth floor of the building, which is the highest point open to the public.

Future plans

Singtel Waterfront Theatre
On 10 April 2017, the Ministry of Culture, Community and Youth announced that a new mid-sized waterfront theatre will be constructed at the now closed open-air car park. The theatre will cater for arts groups which require a mid-sized venue, facilitating modern productions which typically accommodate an audience of 500 to 1,000 people, and will feature flexible seating arrangements for future art showcases. Costing $30 million, the 550-seat venue will be completed by the second half of 2021. Construction on the theatre officially started on 18 June 2019 with a ground-breaking ceremony officiated by Minister of Culture, Community and Youth Grace Fu. On the same day, the new theatre's name was unveiled as the Singtel Waterfront Theatre in recognition of Singtel's S$10 million donation. The Ministry of Culture, Community and Youth will contribute another S$10 million, with Esplanade raising the rest of the funds through donations.

Programmes
Esplanade's programmes are broadly organised around key areas – the community and access programmes form the foundation of activities at the centre, collaborations with mainly local arts groups help develop the industry, while leading international productions aim to offer innovative programmes in the major arts genres. These programmes are presented in different festivals and series designed to appeal to a broad range of audiences.

Esplanade's in-house programming team presents over 14 festivals and 20 on-going series throughout the year.

Featured acts
In the relatively short time that The Esplanade has been open it has played host to acts and performances, including the Queen musical We Will Rock You, Avenue Q and the defunct Mosaic Music Festival. It has also championed locally based acts.

In popular culture
The theatre is featured in HBO series Westworld, as part of the third season.

It is featured in the 2019 video game Mario Kart Tour as part of the Singapore Speedway racecourse.

Gallery

See also
 List of concert halls
 Architecture of Singapore

References

External links

 Official website

Buildings and structures completed in 2002
Downtown Core (Singapore)
Marina Centre
Arts centres in Singapore
Concert halls in Singapore
Opera houses in Singapore
Theatres in Singapore
Tourist attractions in Singapore
Theatres completed in 2002
2002 establishments in Singapore
Event venues established in 2002